Elizabeth was a merchant ship built at Great Yarmouth, England in 1825. She made one voyage transporting convicts from Hobart Town to Sydney, Australia.

Career
The Register of Shipping for 1830 shows Elizabeth with Swan, master, Ridley, owner, and trade Plymouth—New South Wales.
 
Under the command of Captain Swan, she left Hobart Town on 15 December 1830, with cargo, passengers and twelve convicts. She arrived in Sydney on 20 December 1830. Elizabeth departed Port Jackson bound for Launceston and London.

Citations

References

1825 ships
Ships built in England
Convict ships to New South Wales
Age of Sail merchant ships
Merchant ships of the United Kingdom